The Delesseriaceae is a family of about 100 genera of marine red alga.

Genera
As accepted by AlgaeBase (with amount of species per genus);

Subfamily Delesserioideae  (124)
 Tribe	Botryocarpeae  (12)
Botryocarpa Greville - 1 sp.
Hemineura Harvey - 2 spp.
Laingia Kylin - 2 spp.
Marionella F.S. Wagner - 2 spp.
Patulophycus A.J.K. Millar & M.J. Wynne - 1 sp.
Pseudonitophylla M.L. Mendoza - 1 sp.
Pseudophycodrys Skottsberg - 2 spp.
Rhodokrambe R.L. Moe - 1 sp.
Tribe	Claudeeae  (8)
Claudea J.V. Lamouroux - 3 spp.
Vanvoorstia Harvey - 5 spp.
 Tribe	Congregatocarpeae  (3)
Congregatocarpus Mikami - 1 sp.
Neohypophyllum Wynne - 1 sp.
Tokidadendron Wynne - 1 sp.
 Tribe	Delesserieae  (19)
Cumathamnion M.J. Wynne & K. Daniels - 3 spp.
Delesseria J.V. Lamouroux - 10 spp.
Heteroglossum A. Zinova - 2 spp.
Microrhinus Skottsberg - 1 sp.
Odontolaingia Mendoza - 1 sp.
Phycodrina M.J. Wynne - 1 sp.
Pseudogrinnellia M.J.Wynne - 1 sp.
 Tribe	Grinnellieae  (2)
Grinnellia Harvey - 2 spp.
 Tribe	Hypoglosseae  (55)
Bartoniella Kylin - 1 sp.
Branchioglossum Kylin - 8 spp.
Chauviniella Papenfuss - 2 spp.
Duckerella Wynne - 1 sp.
Frikkiella M.J. Wynne & C.W. Schneider - 2 spp.
Hypoglossum Kützing - 33 spp.
Phitycolax M.J. Wynne & Scott - 1 sp.
Phitymophora J. Agardh - 3 spp.
Pseudobranchioglossum M. Bodard - 1 sp.
Tsengiella J. Zhang & B.M. Xia - 1 sp.
Yoshidaphycus Mikami - 1 sp.
Zellera G. Martens - 1 sp.
 Tribe	Membranoptereae	 (21)
Austrofolium M.J. Wynne - 3 spp.
Holmesia J. Agardh - 1 sp.
Loranthophycus E.Y. Dawson - 1 sp.
Membranoptera Stackhouse - 11 spp.
Neoholmesia Mikami - 3 spp.
Pantoneura Kylin - 2 spp.
Tribe Sympodophylleae  (1)
Sympodophyllum E.A. Shepley & H.B.S. Womersley - 1 sp.
 Tribe	Wynneophycuseae	 (1)
Wynneophycus  - 1 sp.
Tribe	Zinovaeeae  (2)
Kurogia Yoshida - 1 sp.
Zinovaea M.J. Wynne - 1 sp.

Subfamily Heterosiphonioideae  (45)
Colacodasya  - 3 spp.
Dasyella  - 1 sp.
Dictyurus  - 4 spp.
Heterosiphonia  - 33 spp.
Sinosiphonia  - 1 sp.
Thuretia  - 3 spp.

Subfamily Nitophylloideae  (94)
 Tribe Martensieae	 (24)
Martensia K. Hering - 24 spp.
 Tribe	Neuroglosseae  (19)
Abroteia Hervey - 1 sp.
Drachiella J. Ernst & Feldmann - 3 spp.
Nancythalia A.J.K. Millar & W.A. Nelson - 1 sp.
Neuroglossum Kützing - 3 spp.
Polycoryne Skottsberg - 2 spp.
Schizoseris Kylin - 9 spp.
 Tribe	Nitophylleae  (50)
Arachnophyllum Zanardini - 1 sp.
Augophyllum S.-M. Lin, S. Fredericq &M.H. Hommersand - 5 spp.
Nitophyllum Greville - 30 spp.
Nitospinosa  - 3 spp.
Polyneurella E.Y.Dawson - 3 spp.
Polyneuropsis M.J.Wynne McBride & J.A.West - 1 sp.
Radicilingua Papenfuss - 5 spp.
Robea  - 1 sp.
Valeriemaya A.J.K. Millar & M.J. Wynne
 Tribe	Papenfussieae  (1)
Papenfussia  - 1 sp.

Subfamily Phycodryoideae  (190)
Tribe	Cryptopleureae  (62)
Acrosorium Zanardini ex Kützing - 17 spp.
Botryoglossum Kützing - 2 spp.
Cryptopleura Kützing - 16 spp.
Gonimophyllum Batters - 4 spp.
Hymenena Greville - 23 spp.
Tribe	Myriogrammeae  (53)
Gonimocolax Kylin - 3 spp.
Haraldiophyllum A.D. Zinova - 5 spp.
Hideophyllum A.D. Zinova - 1 sp.
Myriogramme Kylin - 33 spp.
Neoharaldiophyllum J.C.Kang & M.S.Kim - 4 spp.
Phycoflabellina M.J.Wynne & C.W.Schneider - 1 sp.
Platyclinia J. Agardh - 6 spp.
Tribe	Phycodryeae	 (75)
Calloseris J. Agardh - 1 sp.
Cladodonta Skottsberg - 1 sp.
Crassilingua Papenfuss - 2 spp.
Erythroglossum J. Agardh - 14 spp.
Halicnide J. Agardh - 1 sp.
Haraldia Feldmann - 3 spp.
Heterodoxia J. Agardh - 1 sp.
Hymenopsis Showe M.Lin, W.A.Nelson & Hommersand - 1 sp.
Nienburgia Kylin - 5 spp.
Pseudopolyneura K.W.Nam & P.J.Kang - 3 spp.
Phycodrys Kützing - 30 spp.
Polyneura J. Agardh - 6 spp.			
Sorella Hollenberg - 4 spp.
Sorellocolax Yoshida & Mikami - 1 sp.
Womersleya Papenfuss - 1 sp.
Yendonia Kylin - 1 sp.

Subfamily Sarcomenioideae  (74)
 Tribe	Apoglosseae	 (21)
Apoglossocolax Maggs & Hommersand - 1 sp.
Apoglossum J. Agardh - 6 spp.
Paraglossum J. Agardh - 13 spp.
Phrix J.G.Stewart - 1 sp.
 Tribe	Caloglosseae  (24)
Caloglossa J. Agardh - 22 spp.
Taenioma J. Agardh - 2 spp.
Tribe	Halydictyeae  (4)
Halydictyon  - 4 spp.
Tribe	Sarcomenieae  (25)
Cottoniella	 - 8 spp.Dotyella Womersley & Shepley - 2 spp.Malaconema	 - 2 spp.
Platysiphonia	 - 10 spp.Sarcomenia	 - 1 sp.
Sarcotrichia  - 2 spp.

 (Non-specific assigned tribe genera)Aglaophyllum Montagne - 1 sp.Anisocladella Skottsberg - 2 spp.Mikamiella Wynne - 3 spp.Scutarius Roussel - 1 sp.

Tribe	Dicroglosseae  (1)Dicroglossum'' A.J.K. Millar & Huisman - 1 sp.

References

External links
 Algaebase: Delesseriaceae

 
Red algae families